Bullion Run is a stream in the U.S. state of Pennsylvania. It is a tributary to Scrubgrass Creek.

Bullion Run was named after Thomas Bullion, a pioneer settler.

References

Rivers of Pennsylvania
Rivers of Venango County, Pennsylvania